Herman Kojo Chinery-Hesse (born 1963) is a Ghanaian technology entrepreneur and the founder of theSOFTtribe, the oldest and largest software company in Ghana. He is popularly known as the Bill Gates of Africa. Chinery-Hesse also made the list of 15 Black STEM Innovators. In March 2019, he was introduced as the Commonwealth Chair for Business and Technology Initiatives for Africa.

Biography

Early life and education

Herman Chinery-Hesse was born in Dublin in 1963 to Lebrecht James Nii Tettey Chinery-Hesse and Mary Chinery-Hesse, née Blay. His maternal grandfather was Robert Samuel Blay,  a barrister and Justice of the Supreme Court of Ghana in the First Republic. Blay was the first Vice President of the United Gold Coast Convention (UGCC), of which he was a founding member and a Speaker of the 1969 Constituent Assembly.

Chinery-Hesse was educated at the Mfantsipim School in Cape Coast, Westlake High School  in Austin, Texas, and the Texas State University, from where he graduated with a Bachelor of Science Degree in Industrial Technology.

Career
In 1991, Herman co-founded theSOFTtribe, one of the leading software houses in Africa. Over the years, the company has pioneered a number of groundbreaking products in the following areas:
 Hei Julor!!! a low-cost, mobile-based, mass market community security alert system for Africa
 Government payroll systems
 ERP systems
 Nationwide utility billing systems
 Point of sale systems 
 Electronic payment systems
His project "African Echoes" is aimed at creating African audiobooks for global consumption, such that for the first time ever Africans are in a position to tell their own stories to a worldwide audience. He is an assessor for the Commercial Courts of Ghana.

Honours and recognition
He and his company have won numerous awards and accolades, including the GUBA award in the UK for Exceptional Achievement, the Ghana Millennium Excellence Award for IT, the Ghana Club 100 Award for the Most Innovative Company, the "SMS" App of the Year Award, the Mobile World Lifetime Achievement Award and the Best Entrepreneur in Information and Communication Technology. He also won the Distinguished Alumnus Award from Texas State University,  the first and currently only African recipient of the award.

Chinery-Hesse has been a speaker at many prestigious institutions including the University of Oxford, Harvard Business School, Wharton School of the University of Pennsylvania, Chatham House and Tech4Africa. He has also played a supporting role in the realm of technology and innovation to many Ghanaian presidents in their international engagements. He is a TED Fellow and has featured heavily in the international media's reportage on technology in Africa, including CNN, BBC and Al Jazeera, and publications such as the Ghana Business & Finance Times, The Guardian, Forbes Africa, New African, IEEE Magazine, The Guardian, The Financial Times and many others.

He was named one of 20 Notable Black Innovators in Technology, one of Africa's Top 20 Tech Influencers, among the Top 100 Most Influential Africans of our Time, and one of the Top 100 Global Thinkers by Foreign Policy Magazine.

References

1963 births
Businesspeople in software
Ga-Adangbe people
Ghanaian businesspeople
Ghanaian people of Danish descent
Ghanaian people of German descent
Hesse family of Ghana
Living people
Mfantsipim School alumni
Texas State University alumni
Ghanaian people of English descent
Ghanaian people of Jamaican descent